The Chile women's national field hockey team represents Chile in the international field hockey. The team is governed by the International Hockey Federation and the PAHF. The team is also known by the nickname Las Diablas, which translates to The Devils. It is controlled by the Chilean Hockey Federation. The team is currently ranked 14th in the FIH World Rankings, with 1430 points.

History
Hockey arrived in Chile in the middle of the 20th century. Chile's national team have had success at a continental level, but has never stemmed this worldwide. The team has never qualified for an Olympic Games, while they made their World Cup debut at the 2022 edition.

The Chilean women's most successful year came in 2017, with their silver medal performance at the 2017 Pan American Cup. The team made history by recording their first ever win over the United States in official competition, and progressing to the final for the first time.

Chile has medalled at one Pan American Games, in Guadalajara 2011. At the tournament, the team won a bronze medal after defeating Canada. Chile have narrowly missed medals at the event on three other occasions, finishing in fourth place. 

Chile has also seen great success in its junior national team. The junior team has qualified for and competed in three Junior World Cups, and has medalled at four Pan American Junior Championships.

Tournament records

Current roster
The following 18 players were named in the squad for the FIH Nations Cup in Valencia.

Caps and goals current as of 17 December 2022 after the match against South Africa.

Head coach: Sergio Vigil

Araya
Irazoqui

The remainder of the national team is as follows:

Results

2022 Fixtures and Results

Pan American Cup

FIH World Cup

XII South American Games

FIH Nations Cup

Squad records in official competitions

2020-Present

Sponsors
United Kingdom Umbro
Germany Puma (In Guadalajara 2011)
Chile Vtr
Chile Vive! Deportes
Chile Tur-Bus
Chile El Mercurio
Chile Playsafe
Chile Books & Bits

See also
Chile men's national field hockey team
Chile women's national under-21 field hockey team

References

External links
FIH profile

Americas women's national field hockey teams
Field hockey
National team